Lappans is an unincorporated community in Washington County, Maryland, United States. It is the location of St. Mark's Episcopal Church.

References

Unincorporated communities in Washington County, Maryland
Unincorporated communities in Maryland